A shopping mall (or simply mall) is a North American term for a large indoor shopping center, usually anchored by department stores. The term "mall" originally meant a pedestrian promenade with shops along it (that is, the term was used to refer to the walkway itself which was merely bordered by such shops), but in the late 1960s, it began to be used as a generic term for the large enclosed shopping centers that were becoming commonplace at the time. In the U.K., such complexes are considered shopping centres (Commonwealth English: shopping centre), though "shopping center" covers many more sizes and types of centers than the North American "mall". Other countries may follow U.S. usage (Philippines, India, and U.A.E.) while still others (Australia, etc.) follow U.K. usage. In Canadian English, and often in Australia and New Zealand, the term 'mall' may be used informally but 'shopping centre' or merely 'centre' will feature in the name of the complex (such as Toronto Eaton Centre). The term 'mall' is less-commonly a part of the name of the complex.

Many malls have declined considerably in Northern America, and some have closed and become so-called "dead malls". Successful exceptions have added entertainment and experiential features, added big-box stores as anchors, or converted to other specialized shopping center formats such as power centers, lifestyle centers, factory outlet centers, and festival marketplaces. In Canada, shopping centres have frequently been replaced with mixed-use highrise communities.

Types of shopping malls
The International Council of Shopping Centers, based in New York City, which classifies two types of shopping centers as malls: regional malls and superregional malls.

Regional mall

Super-regional mall

Not malls
Not classified as malls are smaller formats such as strip malls and neighborhood shopping centers, and specialized formats such as power centers, festival marketplaces, and outlet centers.

Conversely in some countries, many shopping centers less than half or a quarter of the size of the U.S. minimum to be considered a mall, have "mall" in their names – for example in Namibia or Zambia.

List of types of shopping centers (including malls)
The International Council of Shopping Centers classifies Asia-Pacific, European, U.S., and Canadian shopping centers into the following types:

Abbreviations: SC=shopping center/centre, GLA = Gross Leasable Area, NLA = Net Leasable Area, AP=Asia-Pacific, EU=Europe, Can=Canada, US=United States of America
*does not apply to Europe

History

Forerunners to the American mall
Shopping centers in general, may have their origins in public markets and, in the Middle East, covered bazaars. In 1798 the first covered shopping passage was built in Paris, the Passage du Caire. The Arcade in Providence, Rhode Island claims to be the first shopping arcade in the United States in 1828.

In the mid-20th century, with the rise of the suburb and automobile culture in the United States, a new style of shopping center was created away from downtowns. Early shopping centers designed for the automobile include Market Square, Lake Forest, Illinois (1916), and Country Club Plaza, Kansas City, Missouri (1924).

The suburban shopping center concept evolved further in the United States after World War II (see table above) with larger open-air shopping centers anchored by major department stores, such as the  Broadway-Crenshaw Center in Los Angeles built in 1947, anchored by a five-story Broadway and a May Company California.

Downtown pedestrian malls and use of term mall
In the late 1950s and into the 1960s, the term "shopping mall" was first used, but in the original sense of the word "mall", meaning a pedestrian promenade in the U.S., or in U.K. usage, a "shopping precinct". Early downtown pedestrianized malls included the Kalamazoo Mall (the first, in 1959), "Shoppers' See-Way" in Toledo, Lincoln Road Mall in Miami Beach, Santa Monica Mall (1965). Although Bergen Mall (opened 1957) led other suburban shopping centers in using "mall" in their names, these types of properties were still referred to as "shopping centers" until the late 1960s, when the term "shopping mall" started to be used generically for large suburban shopping centers.

Enclosed malls

The enclosed shopping center, which would eventually be known as the shopping mall, did not appear in mainstream until the mid-1950s. One of the earliest examples was the Valley Fair Shopping Center in Appleton, Wisconsin, which opened on March 10, 1955. Valley Fair featured a number of modern features including central heating and cooling, a large outdoor parking area, semi-detached anchor stores, and restaurants. Later that year the world's first fully enclosed shopping mall was opened in Luleå, in northern Sweden (architect: Ralph Erskine) and was named Shopping; the region now claims the highest shopping center density in Europe.

The idea of a regionally-sized, fully enclosed shopping complex was pioneered in 1956 by the Austrian-born architect and American immigrant Victor Gruen. This new generation of regional-size shopping centers began with the Gruen-designed Southdale Center, which opened in the Twin Cities suburb of Edina, Minnesota, United States in October 1956. For pioneering the soon-to-be enormously popular mall concept in this form, Gruen has been called the "most influential architect of the twentieth century" by Malcolm Gladwell.

The first retail complex to be promoted as a "mall" was Paramus, New Jersey's Bergen Mall. The center, which opened with an open-air format on November 14, 1957 and was enclosed in 1973. Aside from Southdale Center, significant early enclosed shopping malls were Harundale Mall (1958) in Glen Burnie, Maryland, Big Town Mall (1959) in Mesquite, Texas, Chris-Town Mall (1961) in Phoenix, Arizona, and Randhurst Center (1962) in Mount Prospect, Illinois.

Other early malls moved retailing away from the dense, commercial downtowns into the largely residential suburbs. This formula (enclosed space with stores attached, away from downtown, and accessible only by automobile) became a popular way to build retail across the world. Gruen himself came to abhor this effect of his new design; he decried the creation of enormous "land wasting seas of parking" and the spread of suburban sprawl.

Even though malls mostly appeared in suburban areas in the U.S., some U.S. cities facilitated the construction of enclosed malls downtown as an effort to revive city centers and allow them to compete effectively with suburban malls. Examples included Main Place Mall in Buffalo (1969) and The Gallery (1977, now Fashion District Philadelphia) in Philadelphia. Other cities created open-air pedestrian malls.

In the United States, developers such as A. Alfred Taubman of Taubman Centers extended the concept further in 1980, with terrazzo tiles at the Mall at Short Hills in New Jersey, indoor fountains, and two levels allowing a shopper to make a circuit of all the stores. Taubman believed carpeting increased friction, slowing down customers, so it was removed. Fading daylight through glass panels was supplemented by gradually increased electric lighting, making it seem like the afternoon was lasting longer, which encouraged shoppers to linger.

Decline of shopping malls

In the United States, in the mid-1990s, malls were still being constructed at a rate of 140 a year. But in 2001, a PricewaterhouseCoopers study found that underperforming and vacant malls, known as "greyfield" and "dead mall" estates, were an emerging problem. In 2007, a year before the Great Recession, no new malls were built in America, for the first time in 50 years. City Creek Center Mall in Salt Lake City, which opened in March 2012, was the first to be built since the recession.

Shopping malls have two main weaknesses. First, mall visits take an inordinate amount of time.  Only the largest anchors (department stores) have their own exterior entrances and direct access to outside parking.  For most mall tenants (boutique stores), consumers must first search for available parking in a vast parking lot or cavernous parking garage, walk around the mall to locate their desired boutique, find and buy whatever they are looking for, then retrace their steps to return to their car.  Second, engineering, constructing, heating, cooling, ventilating, and securing the lengthy interior corridors of a shopping mall are all extremely expensive. That cost is passed on from mall owners to tenants through common area fees, on top of the cost of renting one's own space, and ultimately borne by mall shoppers in the form of high prices.  For these two reasons, malls began to lose consumers to open-air power centers and lifestyle centers during the 1990s, as consumers preferred to park right in front of and walk directly into big-box stores which featured much lower prices because they lacked the overhead of traditional shopping malls. 

Another issue was that the growth-crazed American commercial real estate industry had simply built too many nice places to shop—far more than could be reasonably justified by the actual growth of the American population, retail sales, or any other economic indicator. The number of American shopping centers exploded from 4,500 in 1960 to 70,000 by 1986 to just under 108,000 by 2010.

Thus, the number of dead malls increased significantly in the early 21st century. The economic health of malls across the United States has been in decline, as revealed by high vacancy rates. From 2006 to 2010, the percentage of malls that are considered to be "dying" by real estate experts (have a vacancy rate of at least 40%), unhealthy (20–40%), or in trouble (10–20%) all increased greatly, and these high vacancy rates only partially decreased from 2010 to 2014. In 2014, nearly 3% of all malls in the United States were considered to be "dying" (40% or higher vacancy rates) and nearly one-fifth of all malls had vacancy rates considered "troubling" (10% or higher). Some real estate experts say the "fundamental problem" is a glut of malls in many parts of the country creating a market that is "extremely over-retailed".  By the time shopping mall operator Unibail-Rodamco-Westfield decided to exit the American market in 2022, the United States had an average of 24.5 square feet of retail space per capita (in contrast to 4.5 square feet per capita in Europe).

In 2019, The Shops & Restaurants at Hudson Yards opened as an upscale mall in New York City with "a 'Fifth Avenue' mix of shops", such as H&M, Zara, and Sephora below them. This is one the first two malls built recently, along with American Dream in which both opened in 2019 since City Creek Center.

Online shopping has also emerged as a major competitor to shopping malls. In the United States, online shopping has accounted for an increasing share of total retail sales. In 2013, roughly 200 out of 1,300 malls across the United States were going out of business. To combat this trend, developers have converted malls into other uses including attractions such as parks, movie theaters, gyms, and even fishing lakes. In the United States, the 600,000 square foot Highland Mall will be a campus for Austin Community College. In France, the So Ouest mall outside of Paris was designed to resemble elegant, Louis XV-style apartments and includes  of green space. The Australian mall company Westfield launched an online mall (and later a mobile app) with 150 stores, 3,000 brands and over 1 million products.

The COVID-19 pandemic also significantly impacted the retail industry. Government regulations temporarily closed malls, increased entrance controls, and imposed strict public sanitation requirements.

Mall design

Vertical malls
High land prices in populous cities have led to the concept of the "vertical mall", in which space allocated to retail is configured over a number of stories accessible by elevators and/or escalators (usually both) linking the different levels of the mall. The challenge of this type of mall is to overcome the natural tendency of shoppers to move horizontally and encourage shoppers to move upwards and downwards. The concept of a vertical mall was originally conceived in the late 1960s by the Mafco Company, former shopping center development division of Marshall Field & Co. The Water Tower Place skyscraper in Chicago, Illinois was built in 1975 by Urban Retail Properties. It contains a hotel, luxury condominiums, and office space and sits atop a block-long base containing an eight-level atrium-style retail mall that fronts on the Magnificent Mile.

Vertical malls are common in densely populated conurbations in East and Southeast Asia. Hong Kong in particular has numerous examples such as Times Square, Dragon Centre, Apm, Langham Place, ISQUARE, Hysan Place and The One.

A vertical mall may also be built where the geography prevents building outward or there are other restrictions on construction, such as historical buildings or significant archeology. The Darwin Shopping Centre and associated malls in Shrewsbury, UK, are built on the side of a steep hill, around the former town walls; consequently the shopping center is split over seven floors vertically – two locations horizontally – connected by elevators, escalators and bridge walkways. Some establishments incorporate such designs into their layout, such as Shrewsbury's former McDonald's, split into four stories with multiple mezzanines which featured medieval castle vaults – complete with arrowslits – in the basement dining rooms.

Components

Food court

A common feature of shopping malls is a food court: this typically consists of a number of fast food vendors of various types, surrounding a shared seating area.

Department stores

When the shopping mall format was developed by Victor Gruen in the mid-1950s, signing larger department stores was necessary for the financial stability of the projects, and to draw retail traffic that would result in visits to the smaller stores in the mall as well. These larger stores are termed anchor store or draw tenant. In physical configuration, anchor stores are normally located as far from each other as possible to maximize the amount of traffic from one anchor to another.

Regional differences

"Mall" versus "shopping center/centre"
Shopping mall is a term used predominantly in North America and some other countries that follow U.S. usage (India, U.A.E., etc.) and others (Australia, etc.) follow U.K. usage.

In the United States, Persian Gulf countries, and India, the term shopping mall is usually applied to enclosed retail structures (and is generally abbreviated to simply mall), while shopping center/centre usually refers to open-air retail complexes; both types of facilities usually have large parking lots, face major traffic arterials, and have few pedestrian connections to surrounding neighbourhoods. Outside of North America, "shopping precinct" and "shopping arcade" are also used.
In Canada, "shopping centre" is often used officially (as in Square One Shopping Centre), but conversationally, "mall" is mostly used.

Europe
There are a reported 222 malls in Europe. In 2014, these malls had combined sales of US$12.47 billion. This represented a 10% bump in revenues from the prior year.

U.K. and Ireland
In the United Kingdom and Ireland, both open-air and enclosed centers are commonly referred to as shopping centres. Mall primarily refers to either a shopping mall – a place where a collection of shops all adjoin a pedestrian area – or an exclusively pedestrianized street that allows shoppers to walk without interference from vehicle traffic.

The majority of British enclosed shopping centres, the equivalent of a U.S. mall, are located in city centres, usually found in old and historic shopping districts and surrounded by subsidiary open air shopping streets. Large examples include West Quay in Southampton; Manchester Arndale; Bullring Birmingham; Liverpool One; Trinity Leeds; Buchanan Galleries in Glasgow; and Eldon Square in Newcastle upon Tyne. In addition to the inner city shopping centres, large UK conurbations will also have large out-of-town "regional malls" such as the Metrocentre in Gateshead; Meadowhall Centre, Sheffield serving South Yorkshire; the Trafford Centre in Greater Manchester; White Rose Centre in Leeds; the Merry Hill Centre near Dudley; and Bluewater in Kent. These centres were built in the 1980s and 1990s, but planning regulations prohibit the construction of any more. Out-of-town shopping developments in the UK are now focused on retail parks, which consist of groups of warehouse style shops with individual entrances from outdoors. Planning policy prioritizes the development of existing town centres, although with patchy success. Westfield London (White City) is the largest shopping centre in Europe.

Russia
In Russia, on the other hand,  a large number of new malls had been built near major cities, notably the MEGA malls such as Mega Belaya Dacha mall near Moscow. In large part they were financed by international investors and were popular with shoppers from the emerging middle class.

Management and legal issues

Shopping property management firms

A shopping property management firm is a company that specializes in owning and managing shopping malls. Most shopping property management firms own at least 20 malls. Some firms use a similar naming scheme for most of their malls; for example, Mills Corporation puts "Mills" in most of its mall names and SM Prime Holdings of the Philippines puts "SM" in all of its malls, as well as anchor stores such as The SM Store, SM Appliance Center, SM Hypermarket, SM Cinema, and SM Supermarket. In the UK, The Mall Fund changes the name of any center it buys to "The Mall (location)", using its pink-M logo; when it sells a mall the center reverts to its own name and branding, such as the Ashley Centre in Epsom. Similarly, following its rebranding from Capital Shopping Centres, intu Properties renamed many of its centres to "intu (name/location)" (such as intu Lakeside); again, malls removed from the network revert to their own brand (see for instance The Glades in Bromley).

Legal issues
One controversial aspect of malls has been their effective displacement of traditional main streets or high streets. Some consumers prefer malls, with their parking garages, controlled environments, and private security guards, over Central business districts (CBD) or downtowns, which frequently have limited parking, poor maintenance, outdoor weather, and limited police coverage.

In response, a few jurisdictions, notably California, have expanded the right of freedom of speech to ensure that speakers will be able to reach consumers who prefer to shop, eat, and socialize within the boundaries of privately owned malls. The Supreme Court decision Pruneyard Shopping Center v. Robins was issued on 9 June 1980 which affirmed the decision of the California Supreme Court in a case that arose out of a free speech dispute between the Pruneyard Shopping Center in Campbell, California, and several local high school students.

World's largest malls
This is an incomplete list of the world's largest shopping malls based on their gross leasable area (GLA), with a GLA of at least .

Combination retail and wholesale shopping malls
Some wholesale market complexes also function as shopping malls in that they contain retail space which operate as stores in normal malls do but also act as producer vendor outlets that can take large orders for export.

Gallery

See also

 Arcade
 Bazaar
 List of largest shopping malls in the United States
 Lists of shopping malls
 Mall kiosk
 Pedestrian zone
 Retail#Types of retail outlets

References

Further reading
 Hardwick, M. Jeffrey (2004). Mall Maker: Victor Gruen, Architect of an American Dream. Excerpt and text search.
 Howard, Vicki (2015). From Main Street to Mall: The Rise and Fall of the American Department Store.
 
 
 Ngo-Viet, Nam-Son (2002). The Integration of the Suburban Shopping Center with its Surroundings: Redmond Town Center. PhD dissertation. University of Washington.
 Scharoun, Lisa (2012). America at the Mall: The Cultural Role of a Retail Utopia. Jefferson, NC: McFarland.

External links

 International Council of Shopping Centers (ICSC)
 American Institute of Architects Retail and Entertainment Committee Knowledge Community

 
Planned commercial developments
Retail buildings
Urban studies and planning terminology
 
Shopping malls
Economy-related lists of superlatives
1980s fads and trends
1990s fads and trends
Architecture records
Articles containing video clips